Žygimantas Pavilionis (born 22 July 1971 in Vilnius) is a Lithuanian politician, Member of the Seimas, former Lithuanian diplomat. From August 2010 to July 2015, he served as the Lithuania's Ambassador to United States and Mexico (2011).

Early life and education
Žygimantas Pavilionis was born in 1971 in Vilnius, Lithuania.

In 1994 graduated from Vilnius University Institute of International Relations and Political Science. In 1995 get master's degree at Vilnius University Faculty of Philosophy.

Diplomatic service
Between 1993 and 1999 he worked as the 3rd Secretary of the Ministry of Foreign Affairs of Lithuania for Western Europe, Assistant of Director of the Political Department, 1st Secretary of the Political Cooperation Division of the European Integration Department, Head of this Division.

From 1999 to 2001 he worked in Brussels, as an Advisor to the Lithuanian Permanent Mission to the European Union, Minister-Adviser. Between 2001 and 2002 Pavilionis was an Adviser to the Minister of the Lithuanian Mission to the European Communities.

From 2002 to 2006 he was Head of the Department of European (later European Union) Integration of the Ministry of Foreign Affairs of Lithuania, was the Deputy of Chief Negotiator of Lithuania with the EU Vygaudas Ušackas.

Between 2006 and 2009 worked as Secretary of the Ministry of Foreign Affairs of Lithuania, 2009–2010 – Ambassador Extraordinary and Plenipotentiary to the Department of Transatlantic Cooperation and Politics, coordinated the Lithuanian Presidency of the Community of Democracies.

On 19 July 2010 President Dalia Grybauskaitė appointed Pavilionis as Lithuanian Ambassador Extraordinary and Plenipotentiary to the United States and Mexico. He left the office on 30 July 2015.

Political life
Since November 2016 he is Member of the Seimas elected in Naujamiestis constituency (from 2020 Naujamiestis-Naujininkai constituency). Pavilionis was considered one of the potential candidates in 2019 presidential election.

Private life
Father – academic Rolandas Pavilionis, mother – professor Marija Aušrinė Pavilionienė. His ex-wife Lina is physician, they have four sons: Augustas, Dominykas, Simonas and Vincentas.
In addition to the Lithuanian language, which is his native language, he is fluent in English, Italian, Russian, French, German, Latin and Hebrew languages.

References 
 Į BALTUOSIUS RŪMUS ŽENGĖ NET ŠEŠI PAVILIONIAI („Lietuvos rytas", 2010 m. rugpjūčio 13 d., Nr. 182 (5946), 3 psl.)

Living people
1971 births
Vilnius University alumni
Ambassadors of Lithuania to the United States
Ambassadors of Lithuania to Mexico
Homeland Union politicians
21st-century Lithuanian politicians
Politicians from Vilnius